The Sonklarspitze, also Sonklarspitz, is a mountain in the Stubai Alps on the border between Tyrol, Austria, and South Tyrol, Italy.

References 

 DAV Sektion Siegerland: "Söldens Stille Seite", 1st ed. 2008, Hiking guide about the Windachtal and the surrounding huts, Verlag Vorländer Siegen,  
 Walter Klier: Alpenvereinsführer Stubaier Alpen, Munich 2006, 
 Alpine Club Map 1:25.000, Sheet 31/1, Stubaier Alpen, Hochstubai

External links 

Mountains of the Alps
Mountains of Tyrol (state)
Mountains of South Tyrol
Alpine three-thousanders
Stubai Alps
Austria–Italy border
International mountains of Europe